Võ Ninh is a commune in Quảng Ninh District, Quảng Bình Province, Vietnam. 
This is an agricultural commune. 

Communes of Quảng Bình province
Populated places in Quảng Bình province